Tim Hicks (born August 29, 1963) is an American businessman and politician serving as a member of the Tennessee House of Representatives from the 6th district. He assumed office on January 12, 2021.

Education 
Hicks graduated from Daniel Boone High School in 1981.

Career 
Outside of politics, Hicks owns Hicks Construction. He was elected to the Tennessee House of Representatives in November 2020 after defeating incumbent James Van Huss in the August 2020 Republican primary.

Personal life 
He and his wife, Keri, have one child.

References 

1963 births
Living people
Republican Party members of the Tennessee House of Representatives
People from Washington County, Tennessee